Mehboob Ali (born 10 April 1990) is a Pakistani sprinter. He competed in the men's 400 metres at the 2016 Summer Olympics.

International competitions

1Disqualified in the semifinals

References

External links

1990 births
Living people
Pakistani male sprinters
Pakistani male hurdlers
Olympic athletes of Pakistan
Athletes (track and field) at the 2016 Summer Olympics
Athletes (track and field) at the 2018 Asian Games
World Athletics Championships athletes for Pakistan
South Asian Games bronze medalists for Pakistan
Asian Games competitors for Pakistan
South Asian Games medalists in athletics
Islamic Solidarity Games competitors for Pakistan
21st-century Pakistani people